"Fingertip" is a song recorded by South Korean girl group GFriend for their fourth extended play The Awakening (2017). The song was released by Source Music on March 6, 2017, as the EP title track.

Composition 
The song was described by Billboard's Tamar Herman as "funk-driven" with a "more energetic sound than their early hits", containing "electric guitar and bass", emphasizing the group's vocals.

Chart performance 
The song debuted and peaked at number 2 on the Gaon Digital Chart, on the chart issue dated March 5–11, 2017, with 151,181 downloads – topping the Download Chart – and 2,946,049 streams. The song placed at number 6 on the chart for the month of March 2017 with 307,267 downloads sold and 10,990,137 streams accumulated. The song has sold over 530,652 downloads as of May 2017. It also debuted at number 95 on Billboard Korea's K-pop Hot 100.

Music videos 
The first music video teaser was released on March 1, 2017. The official music video was released on March 6. A day later, a behind the scenes video was released through the group's official YouTube channel. Two choreography videos were released: "A" version on March 8 and "B" version on March 12.

Accolades

Charts

References 

2017 songs
2017 singles
GFriend songs
Korean-language songs
Kakao M singles
Hybe Corporation singles